John Dawe (14 January 1928 – 26 August 2013) was an Australian sailor. He competed in the Flying Dutchman event at the 1964 Summer Olympics.

References

External links
 

1928 births
2013 deaths
Australian male sailors (sport)
Olympic sailors of Australia
Sailors at the 1964 Summer Olympics – Flying Dutchman
Place of birth missing